Digimon World Dawn and Digimon World Dusk, originally released as  in Japan, are two  role-playing video games for the Nintendo DS handheld game console released in Japan on March 29, 2007 and North America on September 18, 2007. Together, they serve as the second instalment of the Digimon Story series, part of the larger Digimon franchise. Despite their western title, the games are not part of the Digimon World series.

Plot
You take the role of Digimon Tamer rookies ascending the ranks of your tamer team, before a strange virus causes an earthquake in the Sunshine and Darkmoon districts, damaging the access points to the Digital World and causing many Digimon to mysteriously degenerate into Digi-Eggs. The game's overall story changes depending on which version of the game being played, as the player takes the role of either a Night Crow tamer from Darkmoon City or a Light Fang tamer from Sunshine City to uncover the mystery behind the tremors. Despite being two separate games, they have parallel story lines that interweave, with the main tamer teams being in opposition of each other. Players have the option to play as either a boy or a girl which have different appearances depending on the version of the game. Players also get a choice of their starting Digimon in different packs depending on which game is being played;

Gameplay 
Digimon World Dawn and Dusk are story driven dungeon crawl role playing games that focus around collecting and battling over 400 of monsters called Digimon. The quest counter in the main city of each game provides players with quests that they can go on to achieve rewards (species quests) and progress the story (union quests). The areas explored as well as Digimon species encounters differ between versions of the game, with World Dawn having more aqua, bird, dragon and holy species and World Dusk containing more dark, machine, organic and beast species. During battles players can send out up to three Digimon at a time from a total party size of six, battling up to 5 enemies. The turn-based battle system is centered around a field of five zones, with different attacks targeting a different number of zones. Different Digimon species have main attributes and weaknesses which cause attacks to do more or less damage to an enemy Digimon, respectively. Players are also able to equip their Digimon with equipment to further boost their abilities. 

Digimon that don’t fit into the party are instead sent to the Digifarm, allowing them to slowly gain experience, the rate of which can be influenced by decorations that are purchased for the farm. Alongside this, players can also purchase terrain boards and background music to customize the appearance of their Digifarm. Another addition to a player’s home is the Digilab which can be accessed to allow players to create new Digimon. At the start of every battle a Digimon gets partially scanned an amount dependent on your Tamer Rank and once a specific Digimon’s scan level has reached 100% you can then choose to create it at the Digilab. Digimon are also able to evolve into a stronger forms at the Digilab. The Digimon that it evolves into is based on player choice along a branching pathway once a certain level or prerequisites are met and causes its appearance to change and statistics to greatly increase. There are also opportunities to return to a prior evolutionary form, called degenerating in which afterwards the player can select a new evolution path for the Digimon to progress along. Evolution progression goes as follows: Digi-egg, in-training, rookie, champion, ultimate and finally mega. New Digimon can also be obtained by breeding two Digimon together, which creates an egg that will eventually hatch into a creature possessing traits from both parent Digimon. Whilst being able to play with the regular buttons on the Nintendo DS, the game also utilizes the touchscreen and stylus to control movement along the bottom screen, whilst the Digifarm is displayed on the top screen.

Digimon World Dawn and Dusk are compatible with the Nintendo DS’s local wireless capabilities to trade, battle and match (breeding Digimon together to create eggs) Digimon between players. The Nintendo Wi-Fi Connection (WFC) is also available for players to battle and match Digimon across the world. Battling with other players earns Tamer Points which allows for increasing a player’s tamer rank and battling more skilled opponents.

Development
The games' English titles were confirmed on May 16, 2007. The game was exhibited in a small booth at Electronic Entertainment Expo (E3) 2007.

Reception 

Digimon World Dawn and Dusk have received mixed reviews. On Metacritic, Dawn holds an average rating of 68 out of 8 reviews, while Dusk holds a score of 67 out of 10 reviews. Gamespot praised its customization when it came to the variety of Digimon but stated that its story felt weak and that the games as a whole were too similar to their predecessor, Digimon World, ultimately giving the pair a rating of 6/10. RPGFan gave the games a rating of 7.5/10, calling them solid RPG experiences but for players to not expect a deep plot or exceptional graphics. Both games received a score of 7 from IGN, who expressed disappointment with their tedious approach to story quests but enjoyed the amount of content to experience and the battle mechanics.

References

External links
 Official Japanese Site 
 Famitsu Sunburst Site
 Famitsu Moonlight Site

2007 video games
Bandai Namco games
Digimon video games
Nintendo DS games
Nintendo DS-only games
Nintendo Wi-Fi Connection games
Role-playing video games
Video games developed in Japan
Video games featuring protagonists of selectable gender
Video games with isometric graphics
Video games with alternative versions